The Mărtinia (also: Mărtinie) is a left tributary of the river Sebeș in Romania. It flows into the Sebeș in the village Mărtinie.

References

Rivers of Romania
Rivers of Alba County